Hubbard is a city in southeastern Trumbull County, Ohio, United States. It is formed from part of Hubbard Township, which was formed from the Connecticut Western Reserve. The population was 7,636 at the 2020 census. It is a suburb of the Youngstown–Warren metropolitan area.

History
The village takes its name from Nehemiah Hubbard, Jr., a Connecticut Land Company agent from Middletown, Connecticut. Hubbard led a surveying party of which Samuel Tylee, also from Middletown, was a member of. Tylee became the township's first settler in 1801, with his family. Many of the early settlers were farmers from New Jersey who cleared the forested area for crop production. A post office called Hubbard was established in 1826. Until 1861, Hubbard was a relatively small town, but the development of the local coal and iron industries rapidly developed the town over the decade. Hubbard was incorporated a village in 1868, with Nathaniel Mitchell serving as the first mayor.

Geography

Demographics

2010 census
As of the census of 2010, there were 7,874 people, 3,442 households, and 2,185 families living in the city. The racial makeup of the city was 96.5% White, 1.5% African American, 0.1% Native American, 0.3% Asian, 0.1% Pacific Islander, 0.3% from other races, and 1.2% from two or more races. Hispanic or Latino of any race were 1.3% of the population.

There were 3,442 households, of which 26.7% had children under the age of 18 living with them, 46.7% were married couples living together, 12.1% had a female householder with no husband present, 4.7% had a male householder with no wife present, and 36.5% were non-families. 32.6% of all households were made up of individuals, and 15.2% had someone living alone who was 65 years of age or older. The average household size was 2.29 and the average family size was 2.90.

The median age in the city was 43.9 years. 20.3% of residents were under the age of 18; 8.7% were between the ages of 18 and 24; 22.3% were from 25 to 44; 29.6% were from 45 to 64; and 19.1% were 65 years of age or older. The gender makeup of the city was 47.6% male and 52.4% female.

2000 census
As of the census of 2000, there were 8,284 people, 3,456 households, and 2,322 families living in the city. The population density was 2,402.3 people per square mile (927.1/km2). There were 3,666 housing units at an average density of 1,063.1 per square mile (410.3/km2). The racial makeup of the city was 98.08% White, 0.92% African American, 0.11% Native American, 0.14% Asian, 0.01% Pacific Islander, 0.14% from other races, and 0.59% from two or more races. Hispanic or Latino of any race were 0.46% of the population.

There were 3,457 households, out of which 28.0% had children under the age of 18 living with them, 53.7% were married couples living together, 10.2% had a female householder with no husband present, and 32.8% were non-families. 30.0% of all households were made up of individuals, and 15.1% had someone living alone who was 65 years of age or older. The average household size was 2.40 and the average family size was 2.99.

In the city, the population was spread out, with 23.2% under the age of 18, 7.6% from 18 to 24, 26.2% from 25 to 44, 24.7% from 45 to 64, and 18.3% who were 65 years of age or older. The median age was 40 years. For every 100 females, there were 89.7 males. For every 100 females age 18 and over, there were 85.1 males.

The median income for a household in the city was $34,657, and the median income for a family was $42,077. Males had a median income of $34,572 versus $25,052 for females. The per capita income for the city was $19,838. About 5.3% of families and 8.6% of the population were below the poverty line, including 15.4% of those under age 18 and 4.8% of those age 65 or over.

Education
Public education in the city is managed by the Hubbard Exempted Village School District, which operates three schools:

Hubbard Elementary School
Hubbard Middle School
Hubbard High School

All three schools, which serve pre-kindergarten though 12th grade, are housed in a modern complex that was built in 2013.

Notable people
 Cyrus Bussey, Union Army brigadier general during the American Civil War and member of the Iowa Senate from the 3rd district
 Capri Cafaro, member of the Ohio Senate from the 32nd district
 Al Campana, professional American football running back
 Michael Del Bane, member of the Ohio House of Representatives from the 56th district
 Kurtis Drummond, American football safety
 Rudy Hubbard, head football coach of Florida A&M University from 1974 to 1985
 Phil Keaggy, musician, guitarist, CCM artist 
 Patrick McGunigal, Medal of Honor recipient
 Emerson Opdycke, Union Army brigadier general during the American Civil War
 Anthony Smith, professional football player for the Green Bay Packers
 Jimmy Weller III, professional stock car racing driver

References

External links
 City website
 Photos of the Ellwood foundry in Hubbard

Cities in Trumbull County, Ohio
Populated places established in 1795
1795 establishments in the Northwest Territory
Cities in Ohio